Super Bowl V was an American football game played between the American Football Conference (AFC) champion Baltimore Colts and the National Football Conference (NFC) champion Dallas Cowboys to determine the National Football League (NFL) champion for the 1970 season. It was the fifth edition of the Super Bowl and the first modern-era NFL championship game. The Colts defeated the Cowboys by the score of 16–13 on a field goal with 5 seconds left in the game. The game was played on January 17, 1971, at the Orange Bowl in Miami, Florida, the first Super Bowl game played on artificial turf, on first-generation Poly-Turf.

The game was the first Super Bowl played after the completion of the AFL–NFL merger.  Beginning with this game and continuing to the present day, the Super Bowl has served as the NFL's championship game, with the winner of the AFC Championship Game and the winner of the NFC Championship Game facing off in the culmination of the NFL playoffs.  As per the merger agreement, all 26 AFL and NFL teams were divided into two conferences with 13 teams in each. Along with the Colts, the Cleveland Browns and Pittsburgh Steelers agreed to join the ten AFL teams to form the AFC; the remaining 13 NFL teams formed the NFC. This explains why the Colts represented the NFL in Super Bowl III, but the AFC for Super Bowl V. Baltimore advanced to Super Bowl V after posting an  regular season record. Meanwhile, the Cowboys were making their first Super Bowl appearance after posting a  regular season record.

The game is often referred to as the "Blunder Bowl," "Blooper Bowl," or "Stupor Bowl" due to it being marred with poor play, a blocked PAT, missed opportunities, penalties, turnovers, and officiating miscues. The two teams combined for a Super Bowl record 11 turnovers, with five solely in the fourth quarter. The Colts' seven turnovers remain the most committed by a Super Bowl champion. Dallas also set a Super Bowl record with 10 penalties, costing them 133 yards. It was finally settled when Colts rookie kicker Jim O'Brien made a 32-yard field goal with five seconds left in regulation time, then a Super Bowl record for least time in the lead for a champion. Baltimore overcame a 13–6 deficit after three quarters and the loss of its starting quarterback Johnny Unitas to an injury in the second quarter. To date, the game is the only Super Bowl in which the Most Valuable Player Award was given to a member of the losing team: Cowboys' linebacker Chuck Howley, the first non-quarterback to win the award, after making two interceptions (sacks and tackles were not yet recorded).

Due to its blunders, the game is often regarded among the worst Super Bowls played, but is also recognized as the title the Colts needed after losing Super Bowl III.

Background
The NFL awarded Super Bowl V to  Miami on March 17, 1970, at the owners' meeting held in Honolulu. It marked the third Super Bowl to be played in the Orange Bowl. Three cities submitted bids: Miami, New Orleans, and Los Angeles (Coliseum). A potential bid by Pasadena (Rose Bowl) failed to materialize, and Houston (Astrodome) dropped out due to scheduling conflicts with conventions.

Baltimore Colts

The Colts were an unspectacular but well-balanced veteran team, led by 37-year-old star quarterback Johnny Unitas. He had regained his starting spot on the team in 1969 upon recovering from an injury that led him to miss the majority of the 1968 season. Unitas played inconsistently during the 1970 regular season; he threw for 2,213 yards, but recorded more interceptions than touchdowns. He also had injury problems, missing two regular season games and giving Earl Morrall more significant playing time. Morrall put up better statistics (792 yards, 9 touchdowns, 4 interceptions, and a 97.6 passer rating), but head coach Don McCafferty decided to start Unitas for the playoffs. (According to Jim O'Brien, Morrall was just as good as Unitas in the players' opinion.)

In addition, Baltimore had three solid weapons in the passing game: wide receivers Eddie Hinton and Roy Jefferson, and future Hall of Fame tight end John Mackey combined for 119 receptions, 1,917 yards, and 15 touchdowns. In the backfield, running back Norm Bulaich was the team's top rusher with 426 yards and 3 touchdowns, while also catching 11 passes for another 123 yards.

The Colts' main strength was their defense. Pro Bowl defensive tackle Bubba Smith anchored the line. Behind him, the Colts had two outstanding linebackers: Pro Bowler Mike Curtis, who recorded 5 interceptions, and Ted Hendricks. In the secondary, Pro Bowl safety Jerry Logan recorded 6 interceptions for 92 return yards and 2 touchdowns, while safety Rick Volk had 4 interceptions for 61 return yards.

Don Klosterman, formerly with San Diego, Kansas City, and Houston in the AFL, became the Colts' general manager in 1970. Future Colts GM Ernie Accorsi was the public relations director.

Baltimore finished the regular season winning the AFC East with an  record, the best in the AFC. Only the Minnesota Vikings had a better record among all NFL teams at

Dallas Cowboys
The Cowboys overcame many obstacles during the regular season. Running back Calvin Hill, the team's second leading rusher with 577 yards and four touchdowns, was lost for the year after suffering a leg injury late in the regular season. And wide receiver Bob Hayes was benched by head coach Tom Landry for poor performances on several occasions.

Most significantly, the Cowboys had a quarterback controversy between Craig Morton and Roger Staubach; the two alternated as starters during the regular season.  Landry eventually settled on Morton for most of the latter half of the season, because he felt less confident that Staubach would follow his game plan (Landry called all of Morton's plays). Also, Morton had done extremely well in the regular season, throwing for 1,819 yards and 15 touchdowns, with only seven interceptions, earning him a passer rating of 89.8. In contrast, Staubach, although a noted scrambler and able to salvage broken plays effectively, threw for 542 yards, and only two touchdowns with eight interceptions, giving him a 42.9 rating.

Hayes was the main deep threat on the team, catching 34 passes for 889 yards (a 26.1 yards per catch average) and ten touchdowns, while also rushing four times for 34 yards and another touchdown, and adding another 116 yards returning punts. On the other side of the field, wide receiver Lance Rentzel (who would be deactivated for the last few weeks of the season and postseason following an indecent exposure charge; being replaced in the starting lineup by Reggie Rucker) recorded 28 receptions for 556 yards and 5 touchdowns.

However, the main strength on the Cowboys offense was their running game. Rookie running back Duane Thomas rushed 151 times for 803 yards (a 5.1 yards per carry average) and five touchdowns, while adding another 416 yards returning kickoffs. Fullback Walt Garrison, who replaced the injured Hill, provided Thomas with excellent blocking and rushed for 507 yards and three touchdowns. Garrison was also a good receiver out of the backfield, catching 21 passes for 205 yards and 2 touchdowns. Up front, Pro Bowl guard John Niland and Rayfield Wright anchored the offensive line.

Like the Colts, the Cowboys' main strength was their defense. Nicknamed the "Doomsday Defense", they allowed just one touchdown in their last six games prior to the Super Bowl. Their line was anchored by future Hall of Fame defensive tackle Bob Lilly. Behind him, linebackers Lee Roy Jordan, Dave Edwards, and Chuck Howley excelled at stopping the run and pass coverage. The Cowboys had an outstanding secondary, led by Mel Renfro and Herb Adderley, who combined for seven interceptions. Dallas also had two rookie safeties: Cliff Harris and Charlie Waters, who led the team with five interceptions, while Harris recorded two.

Dallas finished the regular season winning the NFC East with a  record, winning their final five regular season games to overcome the St. Louis Cardinals (who lost their final three games and fell to third place in the final standings) and New York Giants (who lost their finale  to the Los Angeles Rams; a Giants victory would have given New York the NFC East title based upon a better division record and forced a coin toss between the Cowboys and Detroit Lions for the wild card playoff spot).

Playoffs

In the playoffs, Dallas defeated Detroit  in sunny weather at the Cotton Bowl, with a field goal and a safety. Then the Cowboys overcame the San Francisco 49ers in the NFC championship game,  aided by Thomas' 143 rushing yards, along with interceptions by Renfro and Jordan late in the third quarter that were both converted into touchdowns.

Meanwhile, the Colts advanced to the Super Bowl by beating the Cincinnati Bengals  and the Oakland Raiders  in the playoffs at Memorial Stadium.

Super Bowl pregame news and notes
For the Colts, Super Bowl V represented a chance to redeem themselves for their humiliating loss to the New York Jets in Super Bowl III. Volk commented, "Going to the game a second time took away some of the awe. I think we were able to focus better. There was no way we were going to let ourselves get beat again."

Meanwhile, the game was a chance for the Cowboys to lose their nickname of "next year's champions" and their reputation of "not being able to win the big games". In the past five seasons, Dallas had won more games, 52 of 68, than any other professional football team, but they had yet to win a league title. The Cowboys had chances to go to the first two Super Bowls, but narrowly lost to the Green Bay Packers in both the 1966 and 1967 NFL Championship games. In the 1966 title game, the Cowboys failed to score a potential tying touchdown on four attempts starting from the Packers two-yard line on the game's final drive. Then in the 1967 title game (the "Ice Bowl"), the Cowboys lost because they allowed the Packers to score a touchdown with sixteen seconds left in the game.

As the designated home team, Dallas was forced to wear its blue jerseys for the Super Bowl under rules in place at the time, which did not allow the home team its choice of jersey color, unlike the regular season and playoff games leading up to the Super Bowl. Dallas had not worn its blue jerseys at home since 1963, as Cowboys general manager Tex Schramm opted to have the team wear white at home in order to present fans with a consistent look. The Cowboys wore their blue jerseys twice during the 1970 season, losing 20–7 at St. Louis in week three and winning 6–2 at Cleveland in week 13. The designated home team was first allowed its choice of jersey color for Super Bowl XIII, allowing the Cowboys to wear white vs. the Pittsburgh Steelers.

Gambling establishments had the Colts as 2 ½ point favorites and projected 36 total points scored.

Vice President Spiro Agnew, a Colts fan since the team began playing in Baltimore in 1953, attended the game. Agnew was Governor of Maryland prior to his election as Richard Nixon's running mate in 1968. Nixon himself was a huge football fan and had a vacation home in Key Biscayne, approximately ten miles from the Orange Bowl.
Also in attendance was boxing great Muhammad Ali, who signed autographs for many young fans. Ali was in south Florida training for his March 8 heavyweight championship fight vs. Joe Frazier in New York City.

Kickoff for this game was at 2:00 pm, making it the earliest starting time in the Eastern Time Zone in Super Bowl history, and one of only three Super Bowls to start in the morning for viewers in the Pacific Time Zone (the others were Super Bowl VI in New Orleans and Super Bowl X in Miami).

Media coverage

Television
The game was broadcast in the United States by NBC Sports (at the time still "a service of NBC News") with play-by-play announcer Curt Gowdy, color commentator Kyle Rote, and sideline reporter Bill Enis. Although the Orange Bowl was sold out for the event, unconditional blackout rules in the NFL in the era prohibited the live telecast from being shown in the Miami area. The blackout was challenged in Miami-Dade District Court by attorney Ellis Rubin, and although the judge denied Rubin's request since he felt he did not have the power to overrule the NFL, he agreed with Rubin's argument that the blackout rule was unnecessary for the Super Bowl. The game was also the first Super Bowl to be carried live in the state of Alaska, thanks to NBC's then-parent company RCA acquiring the Alaska Communications System from the United States Air Force.

The video of the complete original broadcast, up until Chuck Howley's second interception, the first play of the fourth quarter, exists; however, the rest of the fourth quarter is missing from network vaults. The complete audio, including the post-game, does exist. Broadcast excerpts of the crucial fourth-quarter plays, recovered from the Canadian feed of NBC's original, also exist and circulate among collectors. (Two different NFL Films game compilations also cover the fourth-quarter plays, in part.)

46.04 million people in the US watched the game on television, resulting in a rating of 39.9 and a market share of 75.

Entertainment
The bands from Southern University and Southeast Missouri State College performed before the game, while trumpeter Tommy Loy played the national anthem. Loy also played the anthem before every Cowboys' home game from the mid-1960s until the late-1980s. The Southeast Missouri State Golden Eagle Band was featured during the halftime show along with singer Anita Bryant.

The game had one of the first planned jet fly-bys. The fly-by, which was supposed to happen right at the end of the national anthem, ended up coming 5 minutes after the anthem had ended.

This was the third consecutive (and final) Super Bowl to feature the Vince Lombardi Trophy on the 50-yard line. Originally the trophy was supposed to be painted gray, but the league changed it to silver which led to problems washing it out of the poly turf surface.

Halftime show

The Super Bowl V halftime show was headlined by the Southeast Missouri State Marching Band, with Anita Bryant as a guest. Up with People were also included as performers.

This was the third time that the Southeast Missouri State Marching Band had performed at the Miami Orange Bowl (venue of Super Bowl V), having previously performed during the halftime of the 1965 and 1969 Orange Bowl games. The band was directed by LeRoy Mason. During their stay in Miami for the game, the band was accommodated at the McAllister Hotel.

During the roughly 13-minute performance, floats representing each of the league's 26 teams were utilized. Members of two high school bands were utilized to form a geographic outline of the United States.

In the performance, Bryant, standing on a float, sang, "Battle Hymn of the Republic". The arrangement of this song was created by her musical director Charles Bird, and had been created for the band to accompany her. It had been adapted from a previous recording Bryant had done of the tune.

Game summary

First quarter
The first three possessions of Super Bowl V ended quietly with each team punting after a three-and-out. Then, on the first play of the Colts' second drive, Cowboys linebacker Chuck Howley intercepted a pass from Johnny Unitas and returned it 22 yards to the Colts' 46-yard line, the first of 11 combined turnovers committed by both teams. The Cowboys failed to take advantage of the turnover, with a 15-yard holding penalty 10 yards behind the line of scrimmage pushing them back to a 3rd-and-33 situation. Walt Garrison gained 11 yards and Dallas had to punt. However, Colts punt returner Ron Gardin muffed the return, and the loose ball was recovered by Cowboys safety Cliff Harris at the Colts' 9-yard line. The Cowboys were unable to score a touchdown and settled for kicker Mike Clark's 14-yard field goal to establish a 3–0 lead.

After a Colts punt which they failed to keep from reaching the end zone, Cowboys quarterback Craig Morton completed a 41-yard pass to Bob Hayes (Morton's longest pass of the game) to reach the Colts' 12-yard line, with a roughing the passer penalty adding 6 yards (half the distance to the goal), but Dallas was denied the end zone by the Baltimore defense for a second time. Linebacker Ted Hendricks deflected Morton's pass on first down and running back Duane Thomas was tackled for a 1-yard loss on second down.

Second quarter
Morton committed a 15-yard intentional grounding penalty on third down to open the 2nd quarter, pushing the Cowboys back to the 22-yard line and forcing them to settle for Clark's 30-yard field goal, stretching the score to 6–0.

On their next possession the Colts offense got a break. After two straight incompletions to open the drive, Unitas uncorked a pass to Eddie Hinton that was both high and behind the receiver. The ball ricocheted off Hinton's hands, was tipped by Dallas defensive back Mel Renfro, then landed in the arms of tight end John Mackey, who sprinted 75 yards for a touchdown. The Cowboys subsequently blocked Jim O'Brien's extra point attempt to keep the score tied at 6–6, with O'Brien later saying that he was "awfully nervous" and hesitated a second too long before kicking it.

Six minutes into the second quarter, Cowboys linebacker Lee Roy Jordan tackled Unitas, causing him to fumble. Defensive lineman Jethro Pugh recovered the loose ball at the Baltimore 28 and Dallas capitalized three plays later, scoring on a 7-yard touchdown pass from Morton to Thomas to establish a 13–6 lead. The next time the Colts had the ball they quickly turned it over yet again, with Unitas unleashing a fluttering interception to Renfro while being hit fiercely on a pass. Unitas was knocked out of the game permanently on the play with a rib injury and was replaced by Earl Morrall, who was widely blamed for the Colts loss in Super Bowl III. The Cowboys, starting from their own 15, were unable to score any points off the turnover. After sustaining a 15-yard pass interference penalty, they punted. After regaining possession, the Colts offense, led by Morrall, stormed all the way to the Cowboys 2-yard line with less than two minutes remaining in the half. However, the Cowboys defense stiffened. Colts running back Norm Bulaich was stuffed on three consecutive rushing attempts from inside the 2-yard line. On fourth down, Morrall threw an incomplete pass, turning the ball over on downs and ending the half with Dallas leading 13–6.

Third quarter
The second half was a parade of turnovers, sloppy play, penalties, and missed opportunities.

Colts returner Jim Duncan fumbled the opening kickoff of the second half and Dallas recovered. Then the Cowboys drove to the Colts' 1-yard line, but Mike Curtis punched the ball loose from Cowboys running back Duane Thomas before crossing the end zone, and the Colts took over at the 1 as Duncan was credited with the recovery–-a controversial call because when the resulting pile-up was sorted out, Dallas center Dave Manders was holding the ball. The energized Colts then drove to the Cowboys' 44-yard line but came up empty when O'Brien's 52-yard field goal attempt fell short of the goal posts. However, instead of attempting to return the missed field goal, Renfro allowed it to bounce inside their own 1-yard line where it was downed by center Tom Goode (NFL rules prior to 1974 allowed a field goal that fell short of the goal posts to be downed just like a punt; that rule is still in effect in high school football). "I thought it would carry into the end zone", Renfro explained after the game.

Dallas, backed up to its own end zone, punted after three plays. The Colts would have received the ball inside Dallas territory following the punt, but a 15-yard clipping penalty pushed the Colts back to their own 39 to begin the drive. Two plays later, Morrall completed a 45-yard pass to running back Tom Nowatzke to reach the Cowboys 15-yard line.

Fourth quarter
Three plays later, on the first play of the fourth quarter, Morrall threw an interception to Howley in the end zone to preserve the Cowboys' 13–6 lead.

After forcing the Cowboys to punt, the Colts regained the ball on their own 18-yard line, still trailing 13–6. Aided by a pass interference call and a 23-yard completion, the Colts advanced into Dallas territory. Another pass interference call against the Cowboys gave the Colts a first down at the Dallas 39-yard-line.  A run by Nowatzke moved the ball to the 31-yard line.  The Colts then attempted to fool the Cowboys with a flea-flicker, resulting in one of the oddest plays in Super Bowl history. Running back Sam Havrilak took a handoff and ran right, intending to lateral the ball back to Morrall, but Pugh stormed into the backfield and prevented him from doing so.  Havrilak (who played quarterback at Bucknell) then threw a pass intended for Mackey, but it was caught instead by Hinton, who promptly took off for the end zone. However, as Hinton raced toward a touchdown, Cowboys defensive back Cornell Green stripped him from behind at the 11. The loose ball bounced wildly in the field of play, evading recovery attempts by six different players until it was eventually pushed 20 yards through the back of the end zone for a touchback, thus returning the ball to the Cowboys at their 20.

Three plays after the turnover the Cowboys returned the favor. Morton threw a pass that was intercepted by Colts safety Rick Volk, who returned the ball 30 yards to the Cowboys' 3 (Morrall later referred to that play as the play of the game). Two plays later, the Colts scored on a two-yard touchdown run by Nowatzke. O'Brien's extra point sailed through the uprights to tie the game at 13–13. (O'Brien says he was much calmer and more confident on this extra point than on the first one, which was blocked.)

The next two possessions ended in traded punts, with the Cowboys eventually taking over in excellent field position at the Colts 48-yard line with less than two minutes left in the game.

On the second play of this potential game-winning drive, Dallas committed a 15-yard holding penalty (its second offensive holding of the game) on the 42-yard line, which was a spot foul, pushing the team all the way back to its own 27-yard line (the NFL did not reduce the penalty for offensive holding to 10 yards until 1974). Then, on second down and 35, Morton threw a pass that slipped through the hands of running back Dan Reeves and bounced for an interception into the arms of linebacker Mike Curtis, who then returned the ball 13 yards to the Cowboys' 28-yard line.

Two plays later, with nine seconds left in the game, O'Brien kicked the go ahead 32-yard field goal, giving Baltimore a 16–13 lead. O'Brien says he was "on automatic" and was so calm and concentrating so hard that he didn't hear anything and saw only the ball. In an enduring image from Super Bowl V, after O'Brien's game-winning field goal Bob Lilly took off his helmet and hurled it through the air in disgust.

The Cowboys received the ball again on their 40 with a few seconds remaining after O'Brien's ensuing squib kick, but Morton's pass to Garrison was intercepted by Logan at the Baltimore 29, and time expired.

Postscript
Morrall was the top passer of the game, with 7 out of 15 completions for 147 yards, with 1 interception. Before being knocked out of the game, Unitas completed 3 out of 9 passes for 88 yards and a touchdown, with 2 interceptions. Morton completed more passes than Morrall and Unitas combined (12), but finished the game with 118 fewer passing yards (127), and was intercepted 3 times (all in the fourth quarter). Mackey was the top receiver of the game with 2 receptions for 80 yards and a touchdown. Nowatzke was the Colts' leading rusher with 33 yards and a touchdown, while also catching a pass for 47 yards. Dallas running back Walt Garrison was the leading rusher of the game with 65 rushing yards, and added 19 yards on 2 pass receptions.

The newly named Vince Lombardi Trophy was presented to Colts owner Carroll Rosenbloom by Lombardi's widow, Marie Lombardi. To date, it remains the only Super Bowl that the trophy was not presented by the NFL Commissioner.

Referencing the numerous turnovers, Morrall said, "It really was a physical game. I mean, people were flying into one another out there." "It was really a hard-hitting game," wrote O'Brien. "It wasn't just guys dropping the ball. They fumbled because they got the snot knocked out of them." Said Tom Landry:

I haven't been around many games where the players hit harder. Sometimes people watch a game and see turnovers and they talk about how sloppy the play was. The mistakes in that game weren't invented, at least not by the people who made them. Most were forced.

"We figured we could win if our offense didn't put us into too many holes", said 35-year-old Colts lineman Billy Ray Smith, who was playing in his last NFL game, "Let me put it this way, they didn't put us into any holes we couldn't get out of".

Colts defensive end Bubba Smith would later refuse to wear his Super Bowl V ring because of the "sloppy" play.

Don McCafferty became the first rookie head coach to win a Super Bowl. The feat was not repeated until George Seifert led the San Francisco 49ers to victory in Super Bowl XXIV. McCafferty was also the first Super Bowl-winning coach who did not wear coat and tie, opting for a short-sleeved T-shirt with a mock turtleneck.

This Super Bowl would also start a trend with the team that lost the game would come back the next year and win it. Dallas lost this game but they would come back and win it all the next year in Super Bowl VI while their opponents, the Miami Dolphins, lost that game, they would go on to win Super Bowl VII the following season.

Two rule changes that were adopted before the 1974 season were: 
 When the defensive team commits an illegal use of hands, arms, or body foul from behind the line of scrimmage, the penalty will be assessed from the previous spot instead of the spot of the foul.
 The penalties for offensive holding, illegal use of hands, and tripping were reduced from 15-yards to 10-yards.
These would have reduced the severity of the two Dallas offensive holding penalties in Super Bowl V.

This was the first and only Super Bowl where the Trophy presentation was done by somebody other than the commissioner, in this case, Marie Lombardi the wife of recently deceased coach Vince Lombardi. Super Bowl V also marked the debut of the newly renamed Vince Lombardi Trophy.

Box score

Final statistics
Sources:The NFL's Official Encyclopedic History of Professional Football, (1973), p. 149, Macmillan Publishing Co. New York, NY, LCCN 73-3862, NFL.com Super Bowl V, Super Bowl V Play Finder Bal, Super Bowl V Play Finder Dal

Statistical comparison

Individual statistics

1Completions/attempts
2Carries
3Long gain
4Receptions
5Times targeted

Records set
The following records were set or tied in Super Bowl V, according to the official NFL.com boxscore, the 2016 NFL Record & Fact Book  and the ProFootball reference.com game summary. Some records have to meet a required minimum number of attempts in order to be recognized. The minimums are shown (in parenthesis).

Turnovers are defined as the number of times losing the ball on interceptions and fumbles.

Starting lineups
Source:

Officials
 Referee: Norm Schachter #56 second Super Bowl (I)
 Umpire: Paul Trepinski #22 first Super Bowl
 Head Linesman: Ed Marion #26 first Super Bowl
 Line Judge: Jack Fette #39 first Super Bowl
 Back Judge: Hugh Gamber #70 first Super Bowl
 Field Judge: Fritz Graf #34 first Super Bowl
 Alternate Referee: Jack Reader #42 worked Super Bowls I and III as a Back Judge. Named NFL Assistant Director of Officiating in 1974.
 Alternate Umpire: Pat Harder #88 never had an on-field assignment in a Super Bowl. Alternate Umpire for Super Bowl XVI

Note: A seven-official system was not used until 1978, also Back Judge and Field swapped titles in 1998.

References

 Super Bowl official website
 
 
 
 
 Pro Football Stats, History, Scores, Standings, Playoffs, Schedule & Records – Large online database of NFL data and statistics
 Super Bowl play-by-plays from USA Today (Last accessed September 28, 2005)
 All-Time Super Bowl Odds  from The Sports Network (Last accessed October 16, 2005)

Super Bowl
Baltimore Colts postseason
Dallas Cowboys postseason
1970 National Football League season
1971 in American football
1971 in sports in Florida
American football in Miami
Sports competitions in Miami
January 1971 sports events in the United States
1970s in Miami